The 2020 Big Sky Conference men's basketball tournament was the 45th postseason tournament for the Big Sky Conference, scheduled for March 11–14 at CenturyLink Arena in Boise, Idaho. The champion would have earned the Big Sky's berth in the 68-team NCAA tournament.

Due to the COVID-19 pandemic, play was suspended prior to the quarterfinals on Thursday, March 12, and not completed; the NCAA tournament was soon cancelled.

Seeds
All eleven teams participated and were seeded by conference record, with a tiebreaker system; the top five teams received a first-round bye.

Schedule

Bracket

 * denotes overtime period

Game summaries

First round

References

Tournament
Big Sky Conference men's basketball tournament
Big Sky Conference men's basketball tournament
College sports tournaments in Idaho
Basketball competitions in Boise, Idaho
Big Sky Conference men's basketball tournament
Big Sky Conference men's basketball tournament